Wings Over the World may refer to:

 Wings Over the World, a 1979 film
 Wings Over the World, post-apocalyptic civilization in H. G. Wells 1936 film Things to Come